Ersin Demir (born 19 October 1922) was a Turkish sailor. He competed in the Finn event at the 1960 Summer Olympics.

References

External links
 

1922 births
Possibly living people
Turkish male sailors (sport)
Olympic sailors of Turkey
Sailors at the 1960 Summer Olympics – Finn
Sportspeople from Istanbul